The 2012 Florida Republican presidential primary was held on January 31, 2012. Fifty delegates were at stake, none of them RNC (or super) delegates; it is unclear whether these delegates will be allocated proportionally or winner-take-all. Originally awarded 99 delegates, the Republican National Committee removed half of Florida's delegates because the state committee moved its Republican primary before March 6; the Republican National Committee rules also set the delegate allocation to be proportional because the contest was held before April 1. It is a closed primary. There were 4,063,853 registered Republican voters as of January 3, 2012.

Florida is spread over two time zones, so voting wasn't completed until 7 pm CST/8pm EST.

Background

Iowa, New Hampshire and South Carolina, the first three contests in the primary election cycle to eventually determine a parties' nominee, are often the most politically significant states due to the bandwagon effect.  The candidates themselves, their infrastructure and the national media are entrenched in these states and therefore these early states (particularly Iowa and New Hampshire) receive more media and political attention than any other state. Often the candidate with the most momentum from the first three states will become the party nominee. The 2008 GOP Presidential nominee John McCain won New Hampshire and South Carolina. In 2000, George W. Bush won Iowa and South Carolina, and became the party nominee.

In the 2012 primary race, a division formed in the Republican Party between the moderate frontrunner, former Massachusetts governor Mitt Romney, and conservatives who distrusted Romney's perceived liberal tendencies while governor of Massachusetts.  Romney was criticised, among other things, for signing into law the Massachusetts health reform law, which resembled President Barack Obama's Affordable Health Care for America Act. Many in the conservative faction of the Republican Party searched for an alternative.

Iowa was won by former senator Rick Santorum after the votes were certified. New Hampshire was won by Mitt Romney. Former House Speaker Newt Gingrich won South Carolina. This is the first time the first three states have been won by three different candidates.

Significance

In an effort to increase the political importance of their state's primary and receive added media exposure often directed to the early contests, Florida decided to plan their primary ahead of the early contests, a move that violated Republican Party rules and forced early states to move up their contests.  Florida announced that their primary would occur on January 31 instead of the expected March; Iowa, New Hampshire and South Carolina were expected to have their primaries in February but were forced to push their primaries into January, thereby shortening the overall amount of time that each person could campaign. Florida made this move in 2008.

As a result of this calendar violation, Florida was stripped of half of its delegates, awarding only 50 delegates instead of the original 100 delegates.

Dean Cannon, the Republican speaker of the Florida House of Representatives: "My goal all along is for Florida to preserve her place as the fifth spot on the nominating calendar and not to move ahead of Iowa and New Hampshire."

Polling

Result
Results with 100.0% (6,796 of 6,796 Precincts) reporting:

Turnout was 41.16% of the voting-eligible population (4,063,853 registered Florida Republicans).

Google Earth(KML) Map: Results by County

Though Gingrich was leading in Florida shortly after his victory in South Carolina, some missteps within the 10-day buffer period between both primaries allowed Romney to eventually come out on top. Most notably, in a potential effort to appeal to voters on the Space Coast, Gingrich proposed a moon base as a possible project for his Presidency. This was met with derision from many people, including Mitt Romney, who mocked the idea at the CNN Debate. Early voting that took place before Gingrich's South Carolina win was also highly in Romney's favor.

On a regional basis, Gingrich won most of North Florida, while Romney won in the densely populated cities of Central and South Florida.

Controversy

According to a Gingrich campaign memo, he wanted to challenge the results based on an interpretation of the Republican National Committee's rules that state that no contest can be winner-take-all prior to April 1, 2012. Gingrich will request that delegates be divided proportionally, corresponding to the percentage of votes each candidate received. It is not known what result a successful challenge might have.

See also 
 Republican Party presidential debates, 2012
 Republican Party presidential primaries, 2012
 Results of the 2012 Republican Party presidential primaries
 Florida Republican Party
 Florida Democratic primary, 2012

References

External links
Official website of Florida's Secretary of State's office
Official website of the Florida Republican Party
The Green Papers: for Florida
The Green Papers: Major state elections in chronological order

2012 Florida elections
Florida
2012